Darian King was the defending champion but lost in the first round to Mackenzie McDonald.

Cameron Norrie won the title after defeating Tennys Sandgren 6–2, 6–3 in the final.

Seeds

Draw

Finals

Top half

Bottom half

References
Main draw
Qualifying draw

2017 ATP Challenger Tour
2017 Singles